Ali ibn al-Qasim al-Zaqqaq (died 1506/7), from Fes, Morocco is one of the most important authors in the field of Maliki common law. He is the author of the well-known Lamiyat al- Zaqqaq (the popular title of Lamia fi al-Ahkam), a textbook on judicial procedures (Amal). al-Manhaj al-muntakhab is another work by al-Zaqqaq on Maliki fiqh. al-Lulu al-masun fi sadaf al-qawaid al-uyun (written in 1815-16) is the verse summary of al-Zaqqaq's, al-Manhaj al-muntakhab and the commentary of Ahmed Mohammed al-Maqqari (1632) upon it.

Notes

See also
Mohammed al-Qasim al-Sijilmasi

Year of birth unknown
1500s deaths
Year of death uncertain
Moroccan writers
Moroccan Maliki scholars
People from Fez, Morocco
15th-century Moroccan people
16th-century Moroccan people
15th-century jurists
16th-century jurists